Mound Elementary School may refer to:
 Mound Elementary School in Ventura Unified School District, California
 Mound Elementary School in Miamisburg, Ohio
Mound Elementary School in Burleson Independent School District, Texas